Yetysh is a rural locality (a selo) and the administrative center of Yetyshinskoye Rural Settlement, Chernushinsky District, Perm Krai, Russia. The population was 396 as of 2010. There are 7 streets.

Geography 
Yetysh is located 23 km southeast of Chernushka (the district's administrative centre) by road. Kuznetsovo is the nearest rural locality.

References 

Rural localities in Chernushinsky District